Kelliher may refer to:

People
 Lyons Kelliher, American football player and police detective
 Margaret Anderson Kelliher, Speaker of the Minnesota House of Representatives
 Richard Kelliher, Irish/Australian recipient of the Victoria Cross
 Bill Kelliher, guitarist for the heavy metal band Mastodon

Places
 Kelliher, Saskatchewan, Canada
 Kelliher, Minnesota, United States
 Kelliher Township, Beltrami County, Minnesota, United States